Ellie Lucinda Stokes (born 21 November 2003) is an American-born Saint Kitts and Nevis footballer who plays as a forward for the Colgate Raiders and the Saint Kitts and Nevis women's national team.

Early life
Stokes was born in Alexandria, Virginia and raised in Waldorf, Maryland. She has attended the North Point High School in her hometown.

International career
Stokes represented Saint Kitts and Nevis at the 2018 CONCACAF Girls' Under-15 Championship and the 2020 CONCACAF Women's U-17 Championship qualifying stage.

International goals
Scores and results list Saint Kitts and Nevis' goal tally first.

References

2003 births
Living people
Citizens of Saint Kitts and Nevis through descent
Saint Kitts and Nevis women's footballers
Women's association football forwards
Saint Kitts and Nevis women's international footballers
Soccer players from Alexandria, Virginia
People from Waldorf, Maryland
Sportspeople from the Washington metropolitan area
Soccer players from Maryland
American women's soccer players
African-American women's soccer players
American people of Saint Kitts and Nevis descent
21st-century African-American sportspeople
21st-century African-American women